Volksschule Altomünster is a school (Volksschule) in Altomünster in Bavaria (Germany). About 37 teachers are teaching pupils in form 1 to 9.

In a stairway of the school there is an art gallery from the Pop-art-artist Walter Gaudnek who is professor at University of Central Florida (College of Arts and Humanities).

Comenius-partnership 
Since October 2011 the Volksschule Altomünster has a Comenius-partnership. Declared school-partners are the  „Primary School“ in Crook (England) and the „école primaire“ in Flesselles (France). The project-topic is „Healthy Active Citizens Across Europe“.

Bibliography 
 Reinhard Kreitmair: Schule und Bildung in Altomünster bis 1919. In: Wilhelm Liebhart (Hrsg.): Altomünster: Kloster, Markt und Gemeinde. 1023 S., Altomünster 1999, S.579-601, .
 Fritz Ebshäuser: Das moderne Schulwesen. In: Wilhelm Liebhart (Hrsg.): Altomünster: Kloster, Markt und Gemeinde. 1023 S., Altomünster 1999, S.603-626, .

References

External links 
 Volksschule Altomünster - (official site)

Schools in Bavaria
Dachau (district)